Southwest Cove  is a Canadian rural community located in Halifax County, Nova Scotia.

Communities in Halifax, Nova Scotia